Compare the Meerkat is an advertising campaign on  British and Australian commercial television for comparethemarket.com, a price comparison website, part of BGL Group. The adverts feature Aleksandr Orlov, a CGI anthropomorphic Russian meerkat and his family and friends. Orlov is portrayed as being of aristocratic stock and the founder of comparethemeerkat.com: the campaign originally centred on his frustration over the confusion between his website and comparethemarket.com, playing on the similarity between the words market and meerkat. Orlov's catchphrase is "Simples".

The campaign, launched on 5 January 2008, was created by advertising agency VCCP. The adverts proved popular and became a commercial success for comparethemarket.com, which became the fourth most visited insurance website in the UK as a result. A book featuring Orlov was published in 2010, and other merchandise has been created in tandem with the campaign.

Campaign
The campaign, designed by ad-agency VCCP, was launched on 5 January 2009 involving a TV spot, companion website and social media links. The advert featured Aleksandr Orlov, a CGI animated anthropomorphic Russian meerkat, who complains at the confusion between his site, comparethemeerkat.com, and comparethemarket.com. The character explains that he has launched a TV advertising campaign to make visitors aware of the difference. The companion website, comparethemeerkat.com, was created alongside the TV advert and in 2010 was receiving more than 2 million hits per month.

The TV spots, and the characters, were directed by Darren Walsh at Nickelodeon Productions. Walsh has directed all of the meerkat television and cinema commercials to date, and has won several awards for the work. In the adverts, Orlov is voiced by Simon Greenall.

On 26 November 2012, Compare the Market began sponsoring the ITV1's long-running soap opera Coronation Street as part of a three-year deal with producers of the series.

The campaign was launched in Australia on 1 February 2013.

On 3 April 2015, comparethemarket.com launched Meerkat Movies, offering customers two-for-one cinema tickets. They partnered with films such as Terminator Genisys and Ant-Man. The advertisements featured the movie trailer, sometimes an interview between Orlov and the cast, and a comment that the movie tickets are two-for-one with Meerkat Movies.

On 3 July 2018, the newly renamed comparethemarket (formerly comparethemarket.com) revealed Meerkat Meals which offers customers two-for-one meals at some restaurants around the UK. The service, powered by the Dining Club Group (trading as ‘tastecard’), launched on 16 July 2018 and is granted for free to new customers and customers that purchased a qualifying product less than one year ago.

Later that year in December Auto-Sergei was released which could help people switch to a better deal. Then in 2019, it was upgraded with credit card eligibility checks.

Characters and advertising 
The adverts are fronted by Aleksandr Orlov (Александр Орлов), a meerkat. According to an interview with the character's designer and director, Darren Walsh at Passion Pictures, Orlov became a billionaire in the 1970s. He is described as living in Moscow, while owning a large mansion in South London, and spends his time on vanity projects such as his website, numerous self-portraits, petitions and film production. 

The campaign has also featured secondary characters from amongst Orlov's friends, family and employees. The most notable of these is Sergei (Сергей), Orlov's IT technician, tea-maker and sidekick, who has also featured in his own adverts.  Before working for Aleksandr, he used to be head of the principal design group for the Soviet space programme during the 1980s. He designed the Meer(kat) space station, and now works with Orlov and Comparethemeerkat. Sergei is first seen in the ad "Sergei", and later guests in "Jacuzzi", "Art Class" and all three of the "Orlov Family Trilogy" advertisements. Sergei had been frequently mentioned on Orlov's Twitter and Facebook accounts, one time was prior to being included in an advert, and Aleksandr even started a petition to add the word 'Simples' to the dictionary because Sergei did not approve of the word in a game of Scrabble. Sergei has also starred in his own adverts without Orlov. In one advert where he phones his father, his full name is confirmed to be Sergei Vladimanov.

The 2011 campaign focused on a fictional Russian village named Meerkovo, which was actually filmed in the British county of Suffolk. The adverts featured new characters complaining about the danger caused to the town by confusion over Comparethemeerkat.com and Comparethemarket.com. The new characters were Maiya (Маийа), Yakov (Яков), Vassily (Василий) and Bogdan (Богдан). A companion website was set up for the campaign containing a map of the town. They appeared on Coronation Street bumpers until 2015 when they’d slipped into obscurity though toys were still made.  In 2018 they made a return in Coronation Street bumpers.

More recently, the adverts have featured Oleg (Ольег), a 'meerpup' (a term the meerkats use to refer to a child) who first appeared as an infant in an advert broadcast on 25 December 2013, where Sergei and Aleksandr find him on their doorstep and take him in. On 25 December 2014, whilst on a trip to Africa with Aleksandr and Sergei, Oleg decides to stay behind after befriending the meerkats there. He reappears when he has a dream in 2016.  In 2017, he appeared in adverts themed around the films Beauty and the Beast and Star Wars: The Last Jedi. Oleg lived in an African village with another pup named Ayana (Аьяна) until their home was destroyed by bulldozers. They hitchhiked across the world looking for Aleksandr and Sergei, and finally found them in San Francisco, where they reassumed care of both Oleg and Ayana.

In 2014, Aleksandr and Sergei featured on the Neighbourhood Watch logo to mark the charity's 50th anniversary.

The April 2015 campaign saw the launch of Meerkat Movies. After suffering from empty nest syndrome, Aleksandr and Sergei travel to Hollywood for a holiday, and whilst on a set tour Aleksandr realises that the best way to reward customers is with cinema tickets. In October 2015, an advert was shown where Sergei goes on a date to a cinema with Nicole Kidman.

Ayana first appeared in a Frozen themed advert in late 2016, and was a young meerkat whom Oleg appeared to have befriended in Africa. She speaks with an English accent. This advert featured the first appearance of Oleg in almost two years.

Since the launch of Meerkat Movies, only Aleksandr and Sergei regularly appeared in the main television advertisements, though the Meerkovo characters continued to feature in the Coronation Street sponsorship bumpers after 2018.

In May 2018, Aleksandr and Sergei performed a rendition of Barbra Streisand's "Don't Rain on My Parade", from the film Funny Girl, to promote the Meerkat Movies campaign.

In December 2018, Auto Sergei, an animatronic meerkat, was introduced, to make life "simples" and then was upgraded for credit card use. He featured in adverts where Aleksandr acts like a CEO for a big company, while Sergei takes on a similar appearance to Steve Jobs in some adverts.

After Oleg and Ayana's return in 2019, a new advert series was shown called Endless Adventures, where the meerkats would walk into a door and find themselves in a movie (which are usually made up ones except for Farmageddon, which was animated by Aardman, and also features Alexander's voice actor Simon Greenall).

In July 2019, in an advert for Meerkat Meals and Meerkat Movies, Aleksandr and Sergei are in San Francisco where they reunite with Oleg, who along with his friend Ayana, travelled from Africa to look for them after several bulldozers destroyed their home.

On 30 November 2020, Compare the Meerkat stopped sponsoring Coronation Street, Simon Daglish said “Comparethemarket.com and Corrie has been one of the UK’s longest-running and most successful partnerships and I would personally like to say a huge thank you to all at Compare the Market for taking a big idea and turning it into an iconic partnership. But, like all good things it has to come to an end... As we approach the 60th birthday of a British institution we are looking for an ambitious brand to connect with the cultural phenomena that is Coronation Street“. This led to complaints  on Twitter .

Withdrawal of adverts during news broadcasts
In February 2022 the company withdrew adverts from being shown during news broadcasts following the start of the Russian invasion of Ukraine stating that it had reviewed its media plan and wanted to avoid the adverts appearing near news on the invasion to ensure that the company was being sensitive to the current situation. However they still air rarely sometimes on news broadcasts, and they still air regularly outside of news broadcasts.

Commercial success
Following the campaign, comparethemarket.com was ranked as the fourth most visited insurance website in the UK, up from 16th in January 2008, and the site's overall sales doubled. By 2010 the site had increased its meerkat share by 76%, where competitors' share had fallen by up to 30% over the same period. , Aleksandr had more than 700,000 Facebook fans and 22,000 followers on Twitter, while on photo-sharing site Flickr there is a popular gallery of Aleksandr's family. According to entrepreneur David Soskin, the wordplay of "meerkat" vs. "market" overcomes the high cost of the latter keyword in sponsored search engine listings.

In 2013, researchers at the University of Liverpool hypothesised that the mass appeal of the marketing campaign was due to the campaign's successful amalgamation of narrative tropes from Russian literature, comedy literature, and adventure literature.

Criticism
On 11 August 2009, an opinion piece in The Guardian newspaper accused the advert series of racism for mocking Eastern European accents. However, the Advertising Standards Authority, following a complaint by the author of the article, stated that it had not received any similar complaints, and ultimately decided to take no action.

Merchandise

Book
Orlov's "autobiography" was released on 28 October 2010, entitled A Simples Life: The Life and Times of Aleksandr Orlov. The book generated more pre-orders than that of other books released at the same time including Tony Blair's memoirs and more than double the pre-orders of autobiographies by Cheryl Cole, David Jason, Russell Brand, Jon Snow, Melanie Chisholm and Dannii Minogue. The book was published by Ebury Publishing.

Downloads
The British  website hosts downloads such as wallpapers, ringtones, text alerts, voicemail messages and some commercial videos. There is also an iPhone application containing background information, a database of English phrases in "meerkat" pronunciation (created from audio clips from the TV adverts), a mongoose "detector", and some videos. The British site previously had these features, however it no longer has them and the app is no longer available, however there is a Meerkat Movies app to redeem the voucher code.

Stuffed toys

From 1 July 2011, a stuffed toy representing one of the characters had been given away with each policy sold via the website. In December 2013, a baby meerkat called Oleg was introduced and subsequently released a toy. In December 2014, Oleg was removed from adverts, but despite this the toy was still available up until 2018.
 
In addition to the seven main characters, there have been limited releases of the school teacher Maiya in a spy outfit, and baby Oleg in a safari outfit.
 
To mark the launch of Batman v Superman: Dawn of Justice two new meerkat toys were released featuring Sergei in a Superman outfit and Aleksandr in a Batman outfit. In December 2016, two more toys were released as limited editions featuring Oleg as Olaf and a new character Ayana as Elsa from Disney's Frozen.
 
To celebrate the 40th anniversary of Star Wars in April 2017, another two new meerkat toys were released featuring Aleksandr in a Luke Skywalker outfit, Sergei in an Obi-Wan Kenobi outfit. From the movie Beauty and the Beast meerkats Oleg as the Beast and Ayana as Belle appeared on the shelves. In the Christmas of 2017 and early 2018, an advert featured Oleg in an BB-8 outfit. All toys were not available after May 2018, although an toy with Oleg in pyjamas was released in 2020 based on an advert where Oleg and Ayana won’t go to sleep.

See also
 Monkey, another popular anthropomorphic animal used in British advertising on products such as PG Tips and ITV Digital since 2001.
 The GEICO gecko, Cockney-accented character in a similar campaign for GEICO insurance in the United States since 1999.

References

Bibliography

External links

Fictional anthropomorphic characters
Advertising characters
Fictional mongooses
2009 in British television
Mascots introduced in 2009
British television commercials
Male characters in advertising